Look In Look Out is the twelfth and, to date, last studio album by the Canadian rock band Chilliwack, released in July 1984. The track "Don’t Stop" achieved modest success as a single.

Track listing

All songs written by Bill Henderson & Ashley Mulford unless noted.

"Got You On My Mind" (3:35)
"Don’t Shoot Me Down" (Henderson) (4:17)
"Who’s Winnin’" (Henderson/Jim Vallance) (4:38)
"I’m Comin’ to You" (Henderson/Mulford/Brian Fawcett) (4:47)
"Gettin’ Better" (3:43)
"Run With Me" (3:30)
"Are You Really Gonna Walk Out" (4:00)
"Don’t Stop" (4:01)
"Dream of You" (Henderson) (4:15)

Musicians
Bill Henderson: guitar, keyboards, percussion, vocals
Ashley Mulford: guitar, vocals
Richard Gibbs: keyboards
Mo Foster: bass
Simon Phillips: drums
Additional Vocals: Mark LaFrance, Saffron & Camille Henderson, Dustin Keller, Bob Rock
Tom Keenlyside: Saxophone

References

1984 albums
Chilliwack (band) albums